The Manchester Conference Centre is a conference centre in Manchester, England that used to be owned and managed by the Opal Property Group, which has several locations, distributed over the campus of Manchester University.  As the Weston Building it was originally built, owned and operated by UMIST.

When it was built in 1992, British universities had already become established in the conference market, providing large-scale facilities for conferences during university vacation down-time, and bringing in cash to help bridge the funding gap.  The Manchester Conference Centre was built to appeal to the corporate market; the architecture is very modern, and all of its facilities are cutting-edge.

The Sackville complex was built in 1991, using the latest technology at the time.  The lower foyer features one of the few Foucault's pendulums in the United Kingdom. As is common for Foucault pendulums that remain in use, it is now pushed by an electro-magnet.

The Manchester Conference Centre's 117 bedroom hotel was rebranded in 2014 to The Pendulum Hotel.

See also
 Manchester Central (Conference Centre) Complex consisting of two venues formerly known as the GMEX Centre and Manchester International Conference Centre (MICC))
 List of Foucault pendulums

External links
 http://www.pendulumhotel.co.uk Pendulum Hotel Website
 Manchester Conference Centre website

Buildings and structures in Manchester